FDV may refer to:
 Federation of the Greens, a political party in Italy
 Festival du Voyageur, a winter festival in Winnipeg, Manitoba, Canada
 Fiji disease virus
 Fill and drain valve, a valve used in space and missile industry which achieves extremely tight leakage, while providing redundant inhibits against external leakage
 Flow divider valve, a valve providing a plurality of output flows from a single fluid source